Ipendo is a town in the Sabou Department of Boulkiemdé Province in central western Burkina Faso. It has a population of 3,135.

References

External links
Satellite map at Maplandia.com

Populated places in Boulkiemdé Province